Bharatiya Lok Dal (English: Indian Peoples' Party) was a political party in India.  The BLD  or simply  BL was formed at the end of 1974 through the fusion of seven parties opposed to the rule of Indira Gandhi, including the Swatantra Party, the Utkal Congress, the Bharatiya Kranti Dal, and the Socialist Party. The leader of the BLD was Charan Singh.

History
In 1977, the BLD combined with the Jan Sangh and the Indian National Congress (Organization) to form the Janata Party. The newly formed Janata Party contested the 1977 elections on the BLD symbol and formed independent India's first government not ruled by the Indian National Congress.

Despite a strong start, the Janata government began to wither as significant ideological and political divisions emerged. Through 1979, support for Morarji Desai had declined considerably due to worsening economic conditions as well as the emergence of allegations of nepotism and corruption involving members of his family. Protesting Desai's leadership, Charan Singh resigned and withdrew the support of his BLD. Desai also lost the support of the secular and socialist politicians in the party, who saw him as favoring the Hindu nationalist BJS. On 19 July 1979 Desai resigned from the government. Dissidents projected Charan Singh as the new prime minister in place of Desai.

President Reddy appointed Charan Singh as the Prime Minister of a minority government on the strength of 64 MPs, calling upon him to form a new government and prove his majority. The departure of Desai and the BJS had considerably diminished Janata's majority, and numerous Janata MPs refused to support Charan Singh. MPs loyal to Jagjivan Ram withdrew themselves from the Janata party. Former allies such as the DMK, Shiromani Akali Dal and the Communist Party of India (Marxist) had distanced themselves from the Janata party. Desperately seeking enough support for a majority, Charan Singh even sought to negotiate with Congress (I), which refused. After only three weeks in office, Charan Singh resigned. With no other political party in position to establish a majority government, President Reddy dissolved the Parliament and called fresh elections for January 1980. President Reddy appointed Charan Singh as the Prime Minister of a minority government on the strength of 64 MPs, calling upon him to form a new government and prove his majority. The departure of Desai and the BJS had considerably diminished Janata's majority, and numerous Janata MPs refused to support Charan Singh. MPs loyal to Jagjivan Ram withdrew themselves from the Janata party. Former allies such as the DMK, Shiromani Akali Dal and the Communist Party of India (Marxist) had distanced themselves from the Janata party. Desperately seeking enough support for a majority, Charan Singh even sought to negotiate with Congress (I), which refused. After only three weeks in office, Charan Singh resigned. With no other political party in position to establish a majority government, President Reddy dissolved the Parliament and called fresh elections for January 1980.

After 1980 elections, Charan Singh came out of the Janata Alliance with his BLP and renamed it has Lok Dal.

Subsequently, Ajit Singh (son of Charan Singh) founded the Rashtriya Lok Dal (RLD). Now BLD is led by Chaudhary Sunil Singh of Aligarh

Constituent Parties 
 Bharatiya Kranti Dal
 Swatantra Party
 Samyukta Socialist Party
 Utkal Congress
 Rashtriya Loktantrik Dal
 Kisan Mazdoor Party
 Punjabi Khetibari Zamindari Union

References

External links
 

 
Defunct political parties in India
Political parties established in 1974
1974 establishments in India
Political parties with year of disestablishment missing
Political parties disestablished in 1977
1977 disestablishments in India